Damsal Dam is an earth-fill dam in Mehingrowal of Hoshiarpur district, northern India. It is on the seasonal Damsal River and primarily serves for flood control and irrigation in the area. The dam is maintained by Kandi Area Dam Maintenance Division, Hoshiarpur.

The dam and reservoir are also called the Mehingrowal watershed and is situated about 20 km from Hoshiarpur town. It had construction cost of Rs. 1203.88 lacs; with a height .

References

Dams in Punjab, India
Dams completed in 2001
Earth-filled dams
2001 establishments in Punjab, India
Hoshiarpur district